1991 in television may refer to:

1991 in American television
1991 in Australian television
1991 in Belgian television
1991 in Brazilian television
1991 in British television
1991 in Canadian television
1991 in Danish television
1991 in Dutch television
1991 in French television
1991 in German television
1991 in Irish television
1991 in Israeli television
1991 in Italian television
1991 in Japanese television
1991 in New Zealand television
1991 in Norwegian television
1991 in Philippine television
1991 in Portuguese television
1991 in Scottish television
1991 in South African television
1991 in Swedish television
1991 in Thai television